Mio Nishimaki (born July 17, 1987) is a female freestyle wrestler from Japan. She won a gold medal on 2008 FILA Wrestling World Championships in category -63 kg.

Awards
Tokyo Sports
Wrestling Special Award (2009)

References 

 Profile on official FILA World Championships website 

Japanese female sport wrestlers
1987 births
Living people
Wrestlers at the 2010 Asian Games

World Wrestling Championships medalists
Asian Games competitors for Japan
21st-century Japanese women